Esteban Germán Guridi (born January 26, 1978) is a Dominican former professional baseball second baseman. Germán played in Major League Baseball (MLB) for the Kansas City Royals, Oakland Athletics, and Texas Rangers.

Career
In the  through  seasons, Germán played sparingly, appearing in a total of 50 games.

On December 8, 2005, during the Winter Meetings, Germán was acquired by Kansas City from the Rangers for minor leaguer Fabio Castro. In  as a member of the Royals, Germán saw an increase in playing time and made an impression. In 106 games that season, he batted .326 with three home runs and 34 RBIs, while playing a range of positions which included all four infield positions, left field, center field, and designated hitter.

On March 13, 2009, Germán signed a minor league deal with the Chicago Cubs and was invited to spring training, but was released a month later. On April 8, 2009 the Rangers re-signed Germán to a minor league contract.

On December 16, 2009, German, was outrighted off the 40 man roster to Triple-A.  He would have his contract repurchased by the Rangers, and returned to the 40-man roster, in September 2010.

In 2011, he had 11 at-bats in 11 games for the Rangers, splitting his time in the field between second base and third base. He elected free agency on November 4.

German signed with the Saitama Seibu Lions in Japan on December 14, 2011.

German signed with the Orix Buffaloes in Japan for the 2014 season.

References

External links

1978 births
Living people
Arizona League Athletics players
Dominican Republic expatriate baseball players in Japan
Dominican Republic expatriate baseball players in the United States
Kansas City Royals players
Leones del Escogido players
Major League Baseball infielders
Major League Baseball left fielders
Major League Baseball players from the Dominican Republic
Midland RockHounds players
Modesto A's players
Nippon Professional Baseball center fielders
Nippon Professional Baseball left fielders
Nippon Professional Baseball second basemen
Nippon Professional Baseball third basemen
Oakland Athletics players
Oklahoma RedHawks players
Oklahoma City RedHawks players
Orix Buffaloes players
Sacramento River Cats players
Saitama Seibu Lions players
Texas Rangers players
Toros del Este players
Visalia Oaks players
Azucareros del Este players
Round Rock Express players
Sportspeople from Santo Domingo